Kjell Erik Wangen (24 January 1942 – 16 May 2019) was a Norwegian football defender.

He played for Skeid between 1960 and 1970, becoming league champion in 1966 and cup champion in 1963 and 1965. He represented Norway as a youth, under-21 and senior international. He was later player-coach of Raumnes og Årnes IL.

References

External links
 

1942 births
2019 deaths
Footballers from Oslo
Norwegian footballers
Skeid Fotball players
Norway youth international footballers
Norway under-21 international footballers
Norway international footballers
Association football defenders